John Ryle (fl. 1414), of Lincoln, was an English politician.

He was elected Mayor of Lincoln for 1412 and a Member (MP) of the Parliament of England for Lincoln in November 1414.

References

14th-century births
15th-century deaths
English MPs November 1414
Members of the Parliament of England (pre-1707) for Lincoln
Mayors of Lincoln, England